The 1993 season of the NHRA Winston Drag Racing Series (now NHRA Mello Yello Drag Racing Series) consisted of 19 races run between February and October in different parts of the United States.

Schedule

NHRA
NHRA Powerade